Dumisani Ngwenya (born 28 October 1984 in Pietermaritzburg, KwaZulu-Natal) is a former South African footballer.

Career
The striker previously played for AmaZulu and Dynamos.

International career
Ngwenya played his one and only game for the South Africa national soccer team in 2008.

Notes

1984 births
Living people
Association football forwards
Sportspeople from Pietermaritzburg
AmaZulu F.C. players
South African soccer players
University of Pretoria F.C. players
South Africa international soccer players
Dynamos F.C. (South Africa) players